One Win  is a South Korean sports film written and directed by Shin Yeon-shick starring Song Kang-ho and Park Jeong-min. It depicts the story of a volleyball coach who has never tasted success in his life, meets a women's volleyball team that only needs one win and takes on a challenge.

Synopsis 
Woo-jin (Song Kang-ho), a former volleyball MVP player who is running a children's volleyball class on the brink of closure, is selected as the manager of the girls' volleyball team 'Pink Storm' just before the disbandment. According to the manager's contract, Woo-jin only needs to win one game. Winning just one win would not be a problem for Woo-jin, but Pink Storm has only second-class players. Pink Storm's owner, Jeong-Won (Park Jeong-min), sells promising players to other clubs and only recruits players that other clubs refuse to scout. Besides, if the Pink Storm wins even just once, Jeong-won promises to give 20 million won to one random audience. Thanks to this publicity, Pink Storm's popularity soared and the season finally started, but Pink Storm continues to lose. Woo-jin slowly but surely begins to change the team. The Pink Storm, which consists of abandoned players, is about whether or not it will be able to achieve 'one win'.

Cast

Main 
 Song Kang-ho as Kim Woo-jin
 A coach who ran a failing children's volleyball class and was selected as the director of the women's volleyball team just before its disbandment.
 Park Jeong-min as Kang Jeong-won
 A second-generation chaebol and the owner of the women's volleyball team.

Supporting 
 Park Myung-hoon
 Lee Min-ji
 Jang Yoon-ju
 Lee Joo-young as Hani

Guest appearances 
 Kim Yeon-koung

Production 
Filming began in November 2020, and concluded in February 2021.

Release 
The film was invited to the Big Screen Competition section at 52nd International Film Festival Rotterdam where it had its world premiere on January 27, 2023.

References

External links
 
 
 
 

2020s Korean-language films
2020s South Korean films
South Korean sports drama films
Volleyball films